There were five special elections to the United States House of Representatives in 1993, during 103rd United States Congress.

List of elections 

Elections are listed by date and district.

|-
| 
| Les Aspin
|  | Democratic
| 1970
|  | Incumbent resigned January 20, 1993, to become U.S. Secretary of Defense.New member elected May 4, 1993.Democratic hold.
| nowrap | 

|-
| 
| Mike Espy
|  | Democratic
| 1986
|  | Incumbent resigned January 22, 1993, to become U.S. Secretary of Agriculture.New member elected April 13, 1993.Democratic hold.
| nowrap | 

|-
| 
| Leon Panetta
|  | Democratic
| 1976
|  | Incumbent resigned January 23, 1993, to become Director of the Office of Management and Budget.New member elected June 8, 1993.Democratic hold.
| nowrap | 

|-
| 
| Bill Gradison
|  | Republican
| 1974
|  | Incumbent resigned January 31, 1993, to become president of the Health Insurance Association of America.New member elected May 4, 1993.Republican hold.
| nowrap | 

|-
| 
| Paul B. Henry
|  | Republican
| 1984
|  | Incumbent died July 31, 1993.New member elected December 7, 1993.Republican hold.
| nowrap | 

|}

 
1993